Syria (SYR) competed at the 1975 Mediterranean Games in Algiers, Algeria. The medal tally was 16.

Nations at the 1975 Mediterranean Games
1975
Mediterranean Games